A systems analyst, also known as business technology analyst, is an information technology (IT) professional who specializes in analyzing, designing and implementing information systems. Systems analysts assess the suitability of information systems in terms of their intended outcomes and liaise with end users, software vendors and programmers in order to achieve these outcomes. A systems analyst is a person who uses analysis and design techniques to solve business problems using information technology. Systems analysts may serve as change agents who identify the organizational improvements needed, design systems to implement those changes, and train and motivate others to use the systems.

Industry 

As of 2015, the sectors employing the greatest numbers of computer systems analysts were state government, insurance, computer system design, professional and commercial equipment, and company and enterprise management. The number of jobs in this field is projected to grow from 487,000 as of 2009 to 650,000 by 2016.

This job ranked third best in a 2010 survey, fifth best in the 2011 survey, 9th best in the 2012 survey and the 10th best in the 2013 survey.

See also
Change management analyst
Business analyst
Software analyst
Business analysis

References

External links 
 Computer Systems Analysts in the Occupational Outlook Handbook from the  Bureau of Labor Statistics, a unit of the United States Department of Labor

Systems analysis
Business occupations
Computer occupations

de:Systemanalyse#Informatik